Bobby Lee (born 1971) is an American actor and comedian.

Bobby Lee may also refer to:

Bobby C. Lee (born 1975), American entrepreneur
Bobby Lee (musician), American pedal steel guitar player since 1975
Bobby Lee (ice hockey) (1911–1974), Canadian ice hockey player
Bobby Lee (American football) (1945–2009), American football wide receiver

See also
Bobby Lee Hurt (born 1961), American basketball player
Robert E. Lee, Confederate general
Bob Lee (disambiguation)
Robert Lee (disambiguation)